Agathosthenes was a Greek historian or philosopher of uncertain date, who is referred to by Tzetzes as his authority in matters connected with geography.  There is mention of a work of Agathosthenes called "Asiatica Carmina", where some writers read the name "Aglaosthenes"; for Aglaosthenes or Aglosthenes, who is by some considered to be the same as Agathosthenes, wrote a work on the history of Naxos, of which nothing remains, but which was much used by ancient writers.

References

Sources

External links
Agathostenes (Aglaosthenes Historicus) in The Perseus Catalog

Classical Greek philosophers
Hellenistic-era philosophers
Ancient Greek historians known only from secondary sources